Mr. Rickey Calls a Meeting is a play written by Edward Schmidt in 1989.  The play had its debut at the Ironbound Theater in Newark, New Jersey.  The play debuted on the West Coast, in 1992, at the Old Globe Theatre in San Diego, California.  It was last revived at the Lookingglass Theatre Company in Chicago, Illinois, with J. Nicole Brooks as director, as part of the 2011–12 season.  The revival was nominated for three 2012 Equity Joseph Jefferson Award (Jeff Award) for Play Production (Large), Direction, and Ensemble.

Storyline
The play begins with a 64-year-old retired African-American bellhop reminiscing about a meeting he witnessed in 1947, when he was 17 years old.  The play then flashes back to that earlier time.

The majority of the action is set in a New York City hotel room, in the spring of 1947, and the action spans a couple of hours.   Branch Rickey, the owner of the Brooklyn Dodgers, has called a meeting with four prominent African-Americans to discuss breaking the color barrier in Major League Baseball.  The invitees were Jackie Robinson, Joe Louis, Paul Robeson, and Bill Robinson.

The play's characters, except for the bellhop, are all historical figures, but such a meeting never actually took place.

Mr. Rickey has decided to offer Jackie Robinson a job with the Brooklyn Dodgers (Robinson, at this point in time, is already on the Montreal minor league team) and wants the invitees' support to help him address the controversy he knows will ensue.

The invitees, especially Paul Robeson, are suspicious of Rickey's motives, wondering if he is more motivated by profit than altruism.  Another concern of Robeson and Robinson's is the loss of jobs that would ensue when the black-owned black baseball teams inevitably shut down, once all the key black players moved to the white leagues.

The invitees, except Robinson, are in the midst of personal conflicts, such as career declines, that add to the drama.

Finally, Joe Louis, who has had a passive role throughout the play, breaks the impasse with a surprising move.

Characters
 Clancy Hope, elder - A retired bellhop at Hotel Roosevelt Midtown Manhattan, New York
 Clancy Hope, younger - A bellhop at Hotel Roosevelt Midtown Manhattan, New York
 Branch Rickey  - The President and General Manager of the Brooklyn Dodgers and an advocate of breaking the "color line" in professional sports
 Jackie Robinson - Infielder for the Montreal Royals, selected as the first African-American to integrate the Major League Baseball organization
 Joe Louis  -  1946 World Heavyweight Boxing Champion
 Paul Robeson - Renowned artist, singer, actor, political activist
 Bill "Bojangles" Robinson - Called the "King of Tap Dance", a famous entertainer and part owner of a baseball team in the Negro leagues

See also
 One Night in Miami
 Robeson and Jackson

References

External links
  
 
 

1989 plays
American plays
Cultural depictions of Jackie Robinson
Works about Paul Robeson
Cultural depictions of Joe Louis